Elections to South Cambridgeshire District Council took place on Thursday 3 May 2007, as part of the 2007 United Kingdom local elections. Nineteen seats, making up one third of South Cambridgeshire District Council, were up for election. Seats up for election in 2007 were last contested at the 2004 election, when all seats were up for election due to new ward boundaries, and were next contested at the 2011 election. The Conservative Party gained an overall majority on the council for the first time.

Summary
Of the seats being contested at this election, the Conservatives were defending 9 seats, Liberal Democrats were defending 6 seats, and independents were defending 4 seats. Two seats had changed hands at by-elections prior to this election. In November 2004, Liberal Democrats gained Duxford from the Conservatives, while in October 2006 Conservatives gained the Abingtons from the Liberal Democrats. Both by-election gains were successfully defended at this election.

A further three seats were gained by the Conservative Party at this election. Gains from independents in Barton and in Orwell and Barrington as well as from the Liberal Democrats in the Shelfords and Stapleford meant the Conservative Party formed a majority on the council for the first time.

Results

Results by ward

References

2007
2007 English local elections
2000s in Cambridgeshire